Joan Golobart Serra (born 12 January 1961) is a Spanish former footballer who played mainly as a defensive midfielder.

Club career
Born in Barcelona, Catalonia, Golobart did not start playing organised football until he was 17, making his senior debut for local CE L'Hospitalet in the Tercera División. In 1985, after two seasons with neighbours CE Sabadell FC – helping to promotion to Segunda División in his first year and scoring five goals in 30 games in the second – he signed for another side in the region, RCD Español who he supported as a child.

During his five-season spell, Golobart was successfully reconverted from central defender into defensive midfielder. He only had one solid campaign, however, 1986–87 – 35 matches and four goals – as the Pericos finished third in La Liga and qualified for the UEFA Cup, reaching and losing the subsequent final to Bayer 04 Leverkusen.

Golobart scored a rare goal in the 1988–89 promotion/relegation playoffs against RCD Mallorca, but Español went down (2–1 on aggregate). After helping the team to achieve immediate promotion (although he only appeared in eight matches), he did not have his contract renewed and chose to retire rather than represent another club than Español; he was only 29.

Post-retirement
After retiring, Golobart worked in dentistry. Additionally, he became a respected sports analyst, writing newspaper columns for La Vanguardia. He also unsuccessfully ran for Espanyol's presidency.

Personal life
Golobart's son, Román, was also a footballer. He spent most of his career with Wigan Athletic, having been brought up at Espanyol.

References

External links

1961 births
Living people
Spanish footballers
Footballers from Barcelona
Association football midfielders
Association football utility players
La Liga players
Segunda División players
Segunda División B players
Tercera División players
CE L'Hospitalet players
CE Sabadell FC footballers
RCD Espanyol footballers